Tippy Dam or Tippy Hydro was built 1918 and is a hydroelectric dam operated by Consumers Energy.  The original name of the dam was Junction Hydro, but it was renamed to honor a Consumers board of directors member, Charles W. Tippy. The dam spans the Manistee River about 170 miles from its headwaters which include Manistee Lake, on the river's way to Lake Michigan.

Recreation uses
Tippy Dam State Recreation Area is managed and operated by the Michigan Department of Natural Resources as a state park. Just below Tippy Dam is one of the finest trout, steelhead, and salmon fishing areas in Michigan.  During the fall salmon run anglers line the banks shoulder to shoulder trying to catch king salmon that can weigh well over 20 pounds.

Environmental
The hydro spillway chamber at Tippy is used by about 24,600 bats during the summer for roosting, swarming in the fall, and hibernation in the winter.

Statistics
Electric Power produced by the water turbines: 20,000 kilowatts

References

Consumer's Energy at Manistee River

External links

Michigan Department of Natural Resources: Tippy Dam Recreation Area
Manistee County EDO
Hawkins fishing reports at Tippy Dam 

Hydroelectric power plants in Michigan
Dams in Michigan
Buildings and structures in Manistee County, Michigan
Consumers Energy dams
Dams completed in 1918
Energy infrastructure completed in 1918
1918 establishments in Michigan